Bengt Backlund (3 March 1926 – 11 July 2006) was a Swedish flatwater canoer who competed in the early 1950s. He won two bronze medals at the 1950 ICF Canoe Sprint World Championships, earning them in the C-1 1000 m and the C-1 1000m m events.

Backlund also finished fourth in the C-1 10000 m event at the 1952 Summer Olympics in Helsinki.

References

Sports-reference.com profile

1926 births
2006 deaths
Canoeists at the 1952 Summer Olympics
Olympic canoeists of Sweden
Swedish male canoeists
ICF Canoe Sprint World Championships medalists in Canadian